Fernand Linssen (14 October 1928 – 19 June 2011) was a Belgian sprinter. He competed in the 200 metres at the 1948 Summer Olympics and the 1952 Summer Olympics.

References

1928 births
2011 deaths
Athletes (track and field) at the 1948 Summer Olympics
Athletes (track and field) at the 1952 Summer Olympics
Belgian male sprinters
Olympic athletes of Belgium
Place of birth missing